is a Japanese manga series by Kakeru Utsugi. It has been serialized online via Comico Japan since 2014. Futabasha has published sixteen tankōbon volumes since February 2016. An anime television series adaptation by Eight Bit aired from January 11 to March 29, 2018.

Characters

 At the beginning of the series, Sora was sent Mii-kun, a tiny Egyptian mummy, by his father. While initially apprehensive due to previous bad experiences with his father's "gifts", Sora quickly warmed up to Mii-kun and watches over him, in doting parental fashion. He is an excellent cook, great at household chores and sewing, and great at taking care of people. He keeps a journal where he writes down his observations about Mii-kun. His family also keeps a dog named Pochi which is revealed in episode 10 to be a special dog that is fifty years old and can live to be hundreds of years old. Later, in the same episode, Sora's father sends him a talking Anubis sculpture named Aayan.

 Sora's close friend. Initially, he holds a great desire to "mess around" with Mii-kun. However, he quickly comes to realize that Mii is so cute, that he cannot bring himself to tease the tiny mummy. He still shows an occasional sadistic side to him and still shows an interest in knowing what is underneath Mii's bandage. He excels at studying and often helps Sora out. On his way from work, he finds an oni child which he initially throws away due to his fear of caring for him which resulted from a past trauma of being unable to save a dragon from a collector. Tazuki names the oni child Conny but doesn't truly adopt him into the family until episode 9. Above all, Tazuki is very protective of those he cares about, becoming incredibly frightening when his friends are threatened. 

Sora and Tazuki's classmate. A cheerful girl with a distinct fear of lizards. Asa's strength is one of her main character attributes, which is further increased when she is scared, evidenced by the destruction she causes when she finds that a dragon has found his way into her house. Sora helps her get over her fear of lizards and Asa eventually adopts the dragon, naming him Isao.

Daichi is a student at Sora's school in class 5-3. Previously, he was seen as a delinquent, prone to violent outbursts; however, this was a result of chronic night terrors and lack of sleep. Sora helps Daichi out at school, which results in friendship and Sora giving Daichi a baku doodle to draw in the dream-eating creature. When fully rested, Daichi is very kind if a bit timid and jumpy, but he also takes responsibility instantly for the violence he had done in his sleep-deprived state. The baku that helps him stays, being adopted by Daichi, and is named Mukumuku.

 Sora's aunt and sister of Mokuren. She's usually working and tends to undergo a drastic personality change when wearing her glasses (specifically of the red rimmed variety) with her soft spoken, clumsy self replaced by an aggressive and assertive persona. The sarcophagus that Mii-kun arrived in was a present from her brother and used as her napping place. Some of her known careers include model, director, writer, and actress, all of which she is incredibly famous for (though few know her true looks due to her glasses at work). 

 Sora's adventurer father who sends him odd things from overseas. Hence, Sora's initial distrust of Mii-kun as past gifts have included cursed dolls and scarecrows. He also sends a manual for how to care for the little mummy to his son.

Tazuki's little sister. An outspoken if caring girl, she's familiar with Tazuki's interactions with the oni child, Conny, but has little patience with Conny taking her sweets.

Media

Manga
How to Keep a Mummy is a Japanese manga series by Kakeru Utsugi. It has been serialized online via Comico since 2014. Futabasha has published sixteen tankōbon volumes since February 2016.

|}

Anime
Kaori directed the anime at studio Eight Bit. Deko Akao handled the series composition, and Takahiro Kishida is the character designer. Atsushi Nasuda produced the anime. It aired from January 11 to March 29, 2018. The 11-member idol group Iketeru Hearts performed the ending theme,  . Crunchyroll co-produced and streamed the series. The series ran for 12 episodes.

Note

References

External links
 

Anime series based on manga
Comedy anime and manga
Crunchyroll anime
Eight Bit (studio)
Futabasha manga
Iyashikei anime and manga
Japanese webcomics
Japanese webtoons
Fiction about mummies
Webtoons in print